Praseodymium(III) oxalate is an inorganic compound, a salt of praseodymium metal and oxalic acid with the chemical formula C6O12Pr2. The compound forms light green crystals, insoluble in water, also forms crystalline hydrates.

Synthesis
The reaction of soluble praseodymium salts with oxalic acid:

Properties
Praseodymium oxalate forms light green crystals. It is poorly soluble in water.

The compound forms crystalline hydrates (light green crystals): Pr2(C2O4)3•10H2O.

The crystalline hydrate decomposes stepwise when heated:

Uses
The compound is used as an intermediate product in the synthesis of praseodymium. It is also applied to colour some glasses and enamels. If mixed with certain other materials, the compound paints glass intense yellow.

References

Inorganic compounds
Praseodymium compounds
Oxalates